The 2008–09 season was Central Coast Mariners Football Club's 4th season since the inception of the A-League.

Central Coast's A-League season commenced on 15 August 2008. After losing in the Grand Final in the previous season, they again made the finals series after finishing fourth, only to be eliminated by Queensland Roar.

The Mariners also competed in the Pre-Season Cup, where they were eliminated in the group stage.

In Asia, the Mariners lost in the Champions League group stage, drawing two games and losing four.

Players

First team squad

2008–09 A-League squad

2009 AFC Champions League squad

Youth squad

Transfers

In

Out

Club

Coaching staff

Other information

Kit 
Supplier: Reebok

Pre-season and friendlies

Competitions

Overall

Pre-Season Challenge Cup

Group stage

A-League

League table

Results summary

Results by matchday

Matches

Finals series

Minor semi-final

AFC Champions League

Group stage

Statistics

Appearances 

|-
|colspan="14"|Players who made appearances but left the club during the season:

|}

Goalscorers 
Includes all competitive matches. The list is sorted by shirt number when total goals are equal.

Clean sheets

Disciplinary record

Awards 
 PFA A-League Team of the Season: Mile Jedinak

The Mariners Medal dinner was held in early March 2009, in Tumbi Umbi:
 Mariners Medal (players' player of the year): Matt Simon
 Marinators Goal of the Year (fan-voted): John Hutchinson, for his long-range strike against Perth Glory on 31 December 2008
 Golden Boot: Matt Simon
 Chairman's Award: Ben Coonan (media officer)

References 

Central Coast Mariners FC seasons
Central Coast Mariners Season, 2008-09